Saint-Julien is an Appellation d'Origine Contrôlée (AOC) for red wine in the Bordeaux region, located in the Médoc subregion. It takes its name from the commune Saint-Julien-Beychevelle and is one of the six communal appellations in Médoc. A number of classified (Grand Cru Classé) Bordeaux estates are located within the appellation.

History 
The tradition of wine-growing in Saint-Julien-Beychevelle and the way in which its terroir has come to prominence parallels the history of the Médoc wines in general.

Appellation

Area of designated origin 
Saint-Julien wines are mainly produced in the commune of Saint-Julien-Beychevelle, but a few plots can be found elsewhere in Cussac-Fort-Médoc and Saint-Laurent-Médoc.

Saint-Julien-Beychevelle is located between the Margaux and Pauillac appellations, on the left bank of the Gironde estuary.

Geology and orography 
The vineyards lie on a bed of sedimentary rock. Unlike the surface soil, which is an unbroken expanse of pebbles, the subsoil is surprisingly complex and is the reason why Saint-Julien wines vary so much in character.

The vineyards

Grape varieties 
The grape varieties grown under this appellation are the same as those found throughout the Médoc area, i.e. predominantly Cabernet Sauvignon, along with Cabernet Franc, Merlot, Malbec, Petit Verdot and Carménère (traces only).

The maximum permitted yield per hectare is 45 hectolitres, wherever the density of planting is between 6,500 and 10,000 vines per hectare. This appellation is traditionally divided into two areas, although this is a matter of some controversy. The southern wines, which are smoother and more feminine, are closely related to the Margaux wines, while the northern wines, which are more robust and powerful (the Léoville wines, for example, bordering the vineyards of Latour), have more in common with the wines of Pauillac.

Estates

In the Bordeaux Wine Official Classification of 1855, there are no First Growths in Saint-Julien, but several rated Second Growths.

See also 
 Médoc AOC
 Bordeaux wine

References 

 Saint-Julien Bordeaux.com, Le Conseil Interprofessionnel du Vin de Bordeaux (CIVB) 

Footnotes

External links 
Médoc wines Conseil des Vins du Médoc

Bordeaux AOCs